Jack Maguire (February 5, 1925 – September 28, 2001) was an American professional baseball player whose career lasted for eight seasons (1943; 1946–52). He played in 94 Major League games as an outfielder and utility infielder for the New York Giants, Pittsburgh Pirates and St. Louis Browns in –51. A native of St. Louis, Missouri, Maguire threw and batted right-handed.

Maguire spent five seasons in the Giants' farm system before seeing his two full years of Major League service. He logged 30 games played as a left fielder, 13 as a right fielder, six games as a third baseman, three as a second baseman, and two as a first baseman. His 46 hits included five doubles, two triples and two home runs. He saw the most playing time as a member of his hometown Browns during the closing months of the 1951 season. Maguire started 30 games as a left fielder or third baseman, and had nine multi-hit games, including three-hit efforts against the Boston Red Sox and New York Yankees on consecutive days, August 2–3.

As a youth growing up in St. Louis, Maguire gave Yogi Berra his famous nickname. One afternoon, after attending a movie that had a short piece on India, Maguire noticed a resemblance between Berra and the "yogi", or person who practiced yoga, on the screen. Maguire said "I’m going to call you Yogi" and from that moment on, the name stuck.

Maguire also wore uniform #24 of the Giants from 1950 through May 23, 1951, his final game with the club. Rookie centerfielder Willie Mays, recalled from Triple-A, made his MLB debut two days later, on May 25, wearing #14 but he soon inherited 24, and famously wore it for the rest of his Hall of Fame career.

References

External links

1925 births
2001 deaths
Anaheim Valencias players
Baseball players from St. Louis
Jersey City Giants players
Major League Baseball left fielders
Minneapolis Millers (baseball) players
New York Giants (NL) players
Pittsburgh Pirates players
Portland Beavers players
St. Louis Browns players
Trenton Giants players